Shuhada is an area in the Hawalli Governorate in Kuwait City, Kuwait.

Embassies

References

Districts of Hawalli Governorate